Sweet Bunch is a 1983 Greek dramatic experimental independent underground art film directed by Nikos Nikolaidis. The film, produced by Vergeti Brothers and the Greek Film Center, is the second part of the "Years of Cholera" trilogy beginning with The Wretches Are Still Singing (1979) and ending with The Loser Takes It All (2002) which deals with the last decades of the twentieth century. The original Greek title directly references the Greek title of the 1969 Sam Peckinpah film The Wild Bunch. The film uses as background music the 1958 song "Sugartime" written by Charlie Phillips and Odis Echols as well as the 1940 song "Sweet Mara" composed by Leo Rapitis to lyrics by Kostas Kofiniotis which was performed by Kakia Mendri. It was distributed by the Greek Film Center in Greece and by Restless Wind abroad.

Plot
A group of four misfits, Argyris, Andreas, Marina, and Sofia, live together in a house. Andreas just got out of jail. All four have become disillusioned with life and have lost any reason to live or die. They try all criminal experiences with each member of the group choosing a different activity to experiment in: frequenting expensive restaurants and leaving without paying, shoplifting, starring in pornographic films, and creating an anti-state organization. The authorities put them under surveillance, waiting for the slightest false step from any of them before acting violently. The first such misstep occurs when Sofia kills the police chief who monitors their home.

Cast

Despina Tomazani as Sofia
Dora Maskalvanou as Marina
Takis Moschos as Argyris
Takis Spiridakis as Andreas
Alkis Panagiotidis as Xanthos
Lenia Polycrati as Roza
Konstantinos Tzoumas as Konstantinos
Dinos Makris
Andreas Tsafos
Haris Romas
Takis Loukatos
Alkmini Stavrou
Marianna Koutalou
Katerina Sigountou
Fay Tsanetopoulou
Natasa Kapsabeli
Isavella Mavraki
Natasha Assiki
Fotini Kotrotsi
Hristos Zygomalas
Panayotis Kaldis
Manos Tsilimidis
Giorgos Polyhroniadis
Panos Thanassoulis
Nikos Katomeris
Elias Kostandakopoulos
Nikos Stavropoulos
Giannis Kouriotis
Spiros Bibilas
Kostas Baladimas

Accolades
In October 1983, at the Thessaloniki Festival of Greek Cinema, the film won the Athens Film Critics Association Best Picture Award, executive producer, art director, set designer, and costume designer Marie-Louise Bartholomew won the Best Costume Designer Award, Andreas Andreadakis won the Best Editor Award, Marinos Athanasopoulos won the Best Sound Recordist Award, Aris Stavrou won the Best Cinematographer Award, and Takis Spiridakis won the Best Actor Special Mention Award. The Greek Film Critics Association voted this film in 2006 as the joint seventh greatest in Greek cinematic history.

References

Further reading
Vrasidas Karalis, A History of Greek Cinema, New York, New York, Continuum International Publishing Group, 2012, 318 pages.
Alexandros Moumtzis, «Le Nouveau face à l'Ancien (Pandelis Voulgaris, Nikos Panayotopoulos, Nikos Nikolaïdis),» dans Michel Démopoulos (directeur de publication), Le Cinéma grec, Paris, Centre Georges Pompidou, collection «cinéma/pluriel,» 1995, 263 pages. 
Νίκος Γεωργίου Νικολαΐδης, Γλυκιά Συμμορία: Σενάριο, Αθήνα: Συντεχνία, 1984, 150 σελίδες.

External links
Sweet Bunch at Nikos Nikolaidis (Film Director/Writer/Producer)

Sweet Bunch at the Greek Film Archive Film Museum: Home Page Digital Archives, Filmography
Sweet Bunch at 5 Books, 6 Films, and... Nikos Nikolaidis: Films

Sweet Bunch at The New York Times Movies

1983 films
1983 drama films
1980s avant-garde and experimental films
1983 independent films
Greek drama films
1980s Greek-language films
1980s business films
Films about actors
Films about anarchism
Films about death
Films about films
Films about food and drink
Films about pornography
Films about security and surveillance
Films about terrorism
Films directed by Nikos Nikolaidis
Films set in department stores
Films set in Greece
Films set in prison
Films set in restaurants
Films shot in Greece
Films shot in Athens
Women and death
Greek avant-garde and experimental films